Alexander Irvin (January 18, 1800 – March 20, 1874) was an American politician from Pennsylvania who served as a Whig member of the United States House of Representatives for Pennsylvania's 24th congressional district from 1847 to 1849.

Early life
Alexander Irvin was born in Penns Valley, Centre County, Pennsylvania. He attended the public schools of the area and moved to Curwensville in 1820 and to Clearfield, Pennsylvania in 1826.  He engaged in mercantile and lumbering pursuits and was the treasurer of Clearfield County from 1828 to 1830.

Career
Irvin was a member of the Pennsylvania State Senate for the 13th district from 1837 to 1838.  He was named the prothonotary of the Court of Common Pleas in 1842.  He was the recorder of deeds and register of wills of Clearfield County from 1842 to 1844.

He was elected as a Whig to the Thirtieth Congress (March 4, 1847 - March 3, 1849). He was not a candidate for renomination. He was a United States marshal for the western district of Pennsylvania from January 17 to September 3, 1850, when he resigned. He was named a delegate to the Republican National Convention in 1872. He then became engaged in mercantile pursuits at Clearfield until his death in 1874.

He was buried in the Reed addition to the Old Graveyard, now known as Old Clearfield Cemetery in Clearfield, Pennsylvania.

Notes

References

The Political Graveyard

|-

1800 births
1874 deaths
Burials in Pennsylvania
Pennsylvania prothonotaries
Pennsylvania state senators
People from Centre County, Pennsylvania
United States Marshals
Whig Party members of the United States House of Representatives from Pennsylvania
19th-century American politicians